The Maryland state budget for each fiscal year, covering a period ending on June 30, is approved by the Maryland General Assembly. For the fiscal year ending June 30, 2018, Maryland had a budget of $43.6 billion.

Income for the Maryland budget is received from corporate tax, sales tax, individual income tax, and property tax.

Budget by counties 

Maryland's budget is invested in the following departments:

 Maryland Department of Health
 Maryland State Police
 Maryland Department of Transportation ($5 billion annual budget)
 Maryland Department of Natural Resources and its Maryland Department of Natural Resources Police (NRP)
 Maryland Department of General Services
 Maryland Department of Aging
 Maryland Department of Agriculture
 Maryland Department of Public Safety and Correctional Services
 Maryland Office of the Comptroller
 Maryland Police and Correctional Training Commission
 Maryland Transit Administration Police

Budget for the University System of Maryland 

The portion of Maryland's budget invested in University System of Maryland is $5.48 billion. USM is a public corporation and charter school system comprising 12 Maryland institutions of higher education, this budget is distributed among its universities:

 University of Maryland, College Park ($2.1 billion)
 University of Maryland, Baltimore County ($404.9 million)
 University of Maryland, Baltimore ($1.1 billion )
 University of Maryland Eastern Shore ($100 million).
 Frostburg State University ($100 million).
 Coppin State University ($100 million).
 Bowie State University
 Universities at Shady Grove 
 University System of Maryland at Hagerstown 
 Salisbury University 
 Towson University
 University of Maryland Global Campus
 University of Maryland Center for Environmental Science).
 University of Maryland Biotechnology Institute (Located in Inner Harbor).

Budget for Maryland counties

Another portion of the budget is invested in the State of Maryland's 23 counties:

For example, FY 2018 Maryland state budget included $2.3 billion for Montgomery County, of which $1.48 billion was invested in Montgomery County Public Schools and $128 million in Montgomery College. Montgomery County Public Libraries received $40.6 million of the budget. Other departments receiving a share of the FY 2018 budget included Montgomery County Police Department, Montgomery County Fire and Rescue Service, and Department of Recreation.

Government budget balance 

Government budget balance in 2018 presents a gap between budget proposed and Maryland income of $250 million. In 2018, there is no surplus in Maryland finances.

See also 
 List of counties in Maryland

References

Government of Maryland
State budgets of the United States
Taxation in Maryland